West Germany (Federal Republic of Germany) competed at the Olympic Games for the last time as an independent nation at the 1988 Summer Olympics in Seoul, South Korea.  Following German reunification in 1990, a single German team would compete in the 1992 Summer Olympics. 347 competitors, 244 men and 103 women, took part in 194 events in 24 sports.

Medalists

Competitors
The following is the list of number of competitors in the Games.

Archery

In West Germany's fourth archery competition, the six archers were not as successful as the German team had been four years earlier, but nevertheless qualified two individuals for the semifinals and ended up with 6th places in both the women's team and women's individual events.

Women's Individual Competition:
 Claudia Kriz – Final (→ 6th place)
 Christa Oeckl – Preliminary Round (→ 25th place)
 Doris Haas – Preliminary Round (→ 32nd place)

Men's Individual Competition:
 Detlef Kahlert – Semifinal (→ 12th place)
 Manfred Barth – Preliminary Round (→ 54th place)
 Bernhard Schulkowski – Preliminary Round (→ 59th place)

Women's Team Competition:
 Kriz, Oeckl, and Haas – Final (→ 6th place)

Men's Team Competition:
 Kahlert, Barth, and Schulkowski – Preliminary Round (→ 18th place)

Athletics

Men's 5.000 metres
 Dieter Baumann
 First Round — 13:58.58 
 Semi Final — 13:22.71 
 Final — 13:15.52 (→  Silver Medal)

Men's Marathon 
 Ralf Salzmann 
 Final — 2:16.54 (→ 23rd place)

Men's 4 × 100 m Relay 
 Christian Haas, Fritz Heer, Peter Klein, and Dirk Schweisfurth 
 Heat — 39.01
 Semi Final — 38.75
 Final — 38.55 (→ 6th place)

Men's 4 × 400 m Relay 
 Bodo Kuhn, Mark Henrich, Jörg Vaihinger, and Ralf Lübke 
 Heat — 3:03.90
 Norbert Dobeleit, Mark Henrich, Jörg Vaihinger, and Ralf Lübke 
 Semi Final — 3:00.66
 Norbert Dobeleit, Edgar Itt, Jörg Vaihinger, and Ralf Lübke 
 Final — 3:00.56 (→  Bronze Medal)

Men's 3.000m Steeplechase
 Jens Volkmann
 Heat — 8:36.37
 Semi Final — 8:25.19 (→ did not advance)

Men's Javelin Throw 
 Klaus Tafelmeier 
 Qualification — 80.52m
 Final — 82.72m (→ 4th place)

Men's Discus Throw
 Rolf Danneberg
 Qualifying Heat – 65.70m
 Final – 67.38m (→  Bronze Medal)

 Alois Hannecker
 Qualifying Heat – 61.44m
 Final – 64.94m (→ 8th place)

 Wulf Brunner
 Qualifying Heat – 57.50m (→ did not advance)

Men's Hammer Throw
 Heinz Weis
 Qualifying Heat — 77.24m
 Final — 79.16m (→ 5th place)

 Christoph Sahner
 Qualifying Heat — 75.84m (→ did not advance)

Women's 4 × 400 m Relay 
 Helga Arendt, Michaela Schabinger, Gisela Kinzel, and Gudrun Abt 
 Heat — 3:27.75
 Ute Thimm, Helga Arendt, Andrea Thomas, and Gudrun Abt 
 Final — 3:22.49 (→ 4th place)

Women's Marathon 
 Kerstin Preßler 
 Final — 2"34.26 (→ 21st place)

 Gabriela Wolf 
 Final — 2"35.11 (→ 27th place)

Women's Javelin Throw
 Ingrid Thyssen
 Qualification – 63.32m
 Final – 60.76m (→ 8th place)

 Beate Peters
 Qualification – 60.20m (→ did not advance)

Women's Shot Put
 Claudia Losch
 Qualification – 20.39m
 Final – 20.27m (→ 5th place)

 Iris Plotzitzka
 Qualification – 19.06m (→ did not advance)

Women's Heptathlon 
 Sabine Braun
 Final Result — 6109 points (→ 14th place)

 Sabine Everts
 Final Result — 2513 points (→ 27th place)

Boxing

Men's Light Heavyweight (– 81 kg)
 Markus Bott
 First Round — Defeated René Suetovius (GDR), RSC-3
 Second Round — Lost to Nuramgomed Shanavazov (URS), 0:5

Men's Super Heavyweight (+ 91 kg)
 Andreas Schnieders
 First Round — Defeated Tshibalabala Kadima (ZAI), RSC-2 
 Second Round — Defeated Ubola Ovvigbo (NGA), 5:0 
 Quarterfinals — Lost to Janusz Zarenkiewicz (POL), 2:3

Canoeing

Cycling

Fifteen cyclists, twelve men and three women, represented West Germany in 1988.

Men's road race
 Bernd Gröne — 4:32:25 (→ Silver Medal)
 Christian Henn — 4:32:46 (→ Bronze Medal)
 Remig Stumpf — 4:32:56 (→ 14th place)

Men's team time trial
 Ernst Christl
 Bernd Gröne
 Rajmund Lehnert
 Remig Stumpf

Men's sprint
 Frank Weber

Men's 1 km time trial
 Robert Lechner

Men's individual pursuit
 Thomas Dürst

Men's team pursuit
 Thomas Dürst
 Matthias Lange
 Uwe Nepp
 Michael Rich

Men's points race
 Uwe Messerschmidt

Women's road race
 Jutta Niehaus — 2:00:52 (→  Silver Medal)
 Ines Varenkamp — 2:00:52 (→ 12th place)

Diving

Equestrian

Fencing

20 fencers, 15 men and 5 women, represented the West Germany in 1988.

Men's foil
 Ulrich Schreck
 Matthias Gey
 Matthias Behr

Men's team foil
 Matthias Gey, Thorsten Weidner, Matthias Behr, Ulrich Schreck, Thomas Endres

Men's épée
 Arnd Schmitt
 Alexander Pusch
 Thomas Gerull

Men's team épée
 Elmar Borrmann, Volker Fischer, Thomas Gerull, Alexander Pusch, Arnd Schmitt

Men's sabre
 Felix Becker
 Jürgen Nolte
 Stephan Thönnessen

Men's team sabre
 Felix Becker, Jörg Kempenich, Jürgen Nolte, Dieter Schneider, Stephan Thönnessen

Women's foil
 Anja Fichtel-Mauritz
 Sabine Bau
 Zita-Eva Funkenhauser

Women's team foil
 Anja Fichtel-Mauritz, Zita-Eva Funkenhauser, Christiane Weber, Sabine Bau, Annette Klug

Football

Preliminary round (group A)
 West Germany – China 3-0
 West Germany – Tunisia 4-1
 West Germany – Sweden 1-2
Quarter Finals
 West Germany – Zambia 4-0 
Semi Finals
 West Germany – Brazil 1-1 (Brazil won 3-2 in penalty shootout)
Bronze Medal Game
 West Germany – Italy 3-0 (→  Bronze Medal)

Team roster
 Uwe Kamps
 Oliver Reck
 Wolfgang Funkel
 Roland Grahammer
 Thomas Hörster
 Gunnar Sauer
 Michael Schulz
 Rudolf Bommer
 Holger Fach
 Gerhard Kleppinger
 Armin Görtz
 Thomas Häßler
 Olaf Janßen
 Christian Schreier
 Ralf Sievers
 Wolfram Wuttke
 Jürgen Klinsmann
 Fritz Walter
 Frank Mill
 Karlheinz Riedle

Gymnastics

Hockey

Men's team competition
Preliminary round (group B)
 West Germany – Canada 3-1
 West Germany – India 1-1
 West Germany – Great Britain 2-1
 West Germany – South Korea 1-0
 West Germany – Soviet Union 6-0
Semi Finals
 West Germany – Netherlands 2-1
Final
 West Germany – Great Britain 1-3 (→  Silver Medal)

Team roster
 ( 1.) Christian Schliemann (gk)
 ( 2.) Tobias Frank (gk)
 ( 3.) Ulrich Hänel
 ( 4.) Carsten Fischer
 ( 5.) Andreas Mollandin
 ( 6.) Eckhard Schmidt-Opper
 ( 7.) Dirk Brinkmann
 ( 8.) Heiner Dopp (captain)
 ( 9.) Stefan Blöcher
 (10.) Andreas Keller
 (11.) Thomas Reck
 (12.) Thomas Brinkmann
 (13.) Hans-Henning Fastrich
 (14.) Michael Hilgers
 (15.) Volker Fried 
 (16.) Michael Metz
Head coach: Klaus Kleiter

Women's Team Competition
Preliminary round (group B)
 West Germany – South Korea 1-4
 West Germany – Australia 0-1
 West Germany – Canada 2-1
Classification Matches
 5th-8th place: West Germany – United States 2-1
 5th-6th place: West Germany – Canada 4-2 (→ Fifth place)

Team roster
 ( 1.) Pia Büchel (gk)
 ( 2.) Susanne Schmid
 ( 3.) Carola Hoffmann
 ( 4.) Heike Gehrmann
 ( 5.) Dagmar Breiken
 ( 6.) Gabriele Uhlenbruck
 ( 7.) Viola Grahl
 ( 8.) Bettina Blumenberg
 ( 9.) Gaby Appel
 (10.) Martina Hallmen
 (11.) Christine Ferneck
 (12.) Silke Wehrmeister
 (13.) Caren Jungjohann
 (14.) Eva Hegener
 (15.) Susie Wollschläger (gk)
 (16.) Gabriela Schöwe
Head coach: Wolfgang Strödter

Judo

Modern pentathlon

Three male pentathletes represented West Germany in 1988.

Men's Individual Competition:
 Marcus Marsollek – 4964 pts (→ 24th place)
 Michael Zimmermann – 4782 pts (→ 41st place)
 Dirk Knappheide – 4765 pts (→ 42nd place)

Men's Team Competition:
 Marsollek, Zimmermann, and Knappheide – 14511 pts (→ 10th place)

Rhythmic gymnastics

Rowing

Sailing

Shooting

Swimming

Men's 50 m Freestyle
 Frank Henter
 Heat – 22.98
 Final – 23.03 (→ 7th place)
 Stephan Güsgen
 Heat – 23.22
 B-Final – 23.55 (→ 14th place)

Men's 100 m Freestyle
 Thomas Fahrner
 Heat – 50.78
 B-Final – 51.12 (→ 14th place)
 Torsten Wiegel
 Heat – 51.02 (→ did not advance, 19th place)

Men's 200 m Freestyle
 Michael Groß
 Heat – 1:48.55
 Final – 1:48.59 (→ 5th place)
 Thomas Fahrner
 Heat – 1:49.02 
 Final – 1:49.19 (→ 8th place)

Men's 400 m Freestyle
 Stefan Pfeiffer
 Heat – 3:49.52
 Final – 3:49.96 (→ 6th place)
 Rainer Henkel
 Heat – 3:51.50
 B-Final – scratched (→ did not advance, no ranking)

Men's 1500 m Freestyle
 Stefan Pfeiffer
 Heat – 15:07.85
 Final – 15:02.69 (→  Silver Medal)
 Rainer Henkel
 Heat – 15:14.64
 B-Final – 15:18.19 (→ 6th place)

Men's 100 m Backstroke
 Frank Hoffmeister
 Heat – 56.19
 Final – 56.19 (→ 7th place)
 Jens-Peter Berndt
 Heat – 57.08
 Final – scratched (→ did not advance, no ranking)

Men's 200 m Backstroke
 Jens-Peter Berndt
 Heat – 2:01.77
 Final – 2:01.84 (→ 6th place)
 Frank Hoffmeister
 Heat – 2:03.34
 B-Final – 2:01.65 (→ 9th place)

Men's 100 m Breaststroke
 Mark Warnecke
 Heat – 1:03.56
 B-Final – 1:03.40 (→ 11th place)
 Alexander Mayer
 Heat – 1:03.54
 B-Final – 1:03.85 (→ 12th place)

Men's 200 m Breaststroke
 Mark Warnecke
 Heat – 2:22.55 (→ did not advance, 31st place)
 Hartmut Wedekind
 Heat – 2:22.55 (→ did not advance, 31st place)

Men's 100 m Butterfly
 Michael Groß
 Heat – 53.78
 Final – 53.44 (→ 5th place)
 Martin Herrmann
 Heat – 55.20 (→ did not advance, 17th place)

Men's 200 m Butterfly
 Michael Groß
 Heat – 1:58.09
 Final – 1:56.94 (→  Gold Medal)
 Martin Herrmann
 Heat – 2:02.61 (→ did not advance, 21st place)

Men's 200 m Individual Medley
 Peter Bermel
 Heat – 2:04.18
 Final – 2:03.81 (→ 5th place)
 Jens-Peter Berndt
 Heat – 2:04.80
 B-Final – 2:06.76 (→ 15th place)

Men's 400 m Individual Medley
 Jens-Peter Berndt
 Heat – 4:20.93
 Final – 4:21.71 (→ 6th place)
 Peter Bermel
 Heat – 4:22.78
 Final – 4:24.02 (→ 8th place)

Men's 4 × 100 m Freestyle Relay
 Björn Zikarsky, Peter Sitt, Torsten Wiegel, and Thomas Fahrner
 Heat – 3:23.19
 Michael Groß, Thomas Fahrner, Björn Zikarsky, and Peter Sitt
 Final – 3:21.65 (→ 6th place)

Men's 4 × 200 m Freestyle Relay
 Peter Sitt, Rainer Henkel, Stefan Pfeiffer, and Erik Hochstein
 Heat – 7:19.38
 Erik Hochstein, Thomas Fahrner, Rainer Henkel, and Michael Groß
 Final – 7:14.35 (→  Bronze Medal)

Men's 4 × 100 m Medley Relay
 Frank Hoffmeister, Mark Warnecke, Michael Groß, and Björn Zikarsky
 Heat – 3:44.72
 Frank Hoffmeister, Alexander Mayer, Michael Groß, and Björn Zikarsky
 Final – 3:42.98 (→ 4th place)

Women's 50 m Freestyle
 Marion Aizpors
 Heat – 26.20
 B-Final – 26.17 (→ 9th place)
 Christiane Pielke
 Heat – 26.33
 B-Final – 26.22 (→ 10th place)

Women's 100 m Freestyle
 Christiane Pielke
 Heat – 57.47 (→ did not advance, 19th place)
 Katja Ziliox
 Heat – 58.39 (→ did not advance, 31st place)

Women's 200 m Freestyle
 Stephanie Ortwig
 Heat – 2:00.66
 Final – 2:00.73 (→ 7th place)
 Birgit Lohberg-Schulz
 Heat – 2:02.77
 B-Final – 2:02.32 (→ 15th place)

Women's 400 m Freestyle
 Stephanie Ortwig
 Heat – 4:12.18
 Final – 4:13.05 (→ 7th place)
 Alexandra Russ
 Heat – 4:18.67 (→ did not advance, 22nd place)

Women's 800 m Freestyle
 Stephanie Ortwig
 Heat – 8:41.95 (→ did not advance, 16th place)
 Alexandra Russ
 Heat – 8:49.31 (→ did not advance, 17th place)

Women's 100 m Backstroke
 Marion Aizpors
 Heat – 1:03.27
 Final – 1:04.19 (→ 8th place)
 Svenja Schlicht
 Heat – 1:03.72 
 B-Final – 1:03.68 (→ 10th place)

Women's 200 m Backstroke
 Svenja Schlicht
 Heat – 2:16.81
 Final – 2:15.94 (→ 8th place)
 Katja Zisiox
 Heat – 2:26.25 (→ did not advance, 28th place)

Women's 100 m Breaststroke
 Britta Dahm
 Heat – 1:12.98 (→ did not advance, 22nd place)

Women's 200 m Breaststroke
 Britta Dahm
 Heat – 2:35.06 (→ did not advance, 17th place)
 Heike Esser
 Heat – 2:41.34 (→ did not advance, 34th place)

Women's 100 m Butterfly
 Gabi Rehaa
 Heat – 1:02.27
 B-Final – 1:02.63 (→ 15th place)
 Ina Beyermann
 Heat – 1:02.85 (→ did not advance, 19th place)

Women's 200 m Butterfly
 Ina Beyermann
 Heat – 2:13.56
 B-Final – 2:13.74 (→ 10th place)
 Gabi Rehaa
 Heat – 2:13.09
 B-Final – 2:14.20 (→ 11th place)

Women's 200 m Individual Medley
 Birgit Lohberg-Schulz
 Heat – 2:17.46
 B-Final – 2:17.85 (→ 10th place)
 Svenja Schlicht
 Heat – 2:20.31 (→ did not advance, 18th place)

Women's 4 × 100 m Freestyle Relay
 Karin Seick, Christiane Pielke, Katja Ziliox, and Marion Aizpors
 Heat – 3:48.03 
 Stephanie Ortwig, Marion Aizpors, Christiane Pielke, and Karin Seick
 Final – 3:46.90 (→ 7th place)

Women's 400 m Individual Medley
 Birgit Lohberg-Schulz
 Heat – 4:52.05
 B-Final – 4:50.54 (→ 10th place)

Women's 4 × 100 m Medley Relay
 Svenja Schlicht, Britta Dahm, Gabi Rehaa, and Marion Aizpors
 Heat – 4:13.19
 Final – 4:12.89 (→ 7th place)

Synchronized swimming

Three synchronized swimmers represented West Germany in 1988.

Women's solo
 Gerlind Scheller
 Doris Eisenhofer
 Heike Friedrich

Women's duet
 Gerlind Scheller
 Heike Friedrich

Table tennis

Tennis

Men's Singles Competition
 Carl-Uwe Steeb
 First round — Defeated Alexander Volkov (Soviet Union) 7-5 6-4 6-3
 Second round — Defeated Wally Masur (Australia) 6-3 5-7 6-3 1-6 7-5
 Third round — Defeated Anders Järryd (Sweden) 2-6 7-5 6-3 7-5
 Quarterfinals — Lost to Tim Mayotte (United States) 6-7 5-7 3-6
 Eric Jelen
 First round — Lost to Miloslav Mečíř (Czechoslovakia) 7-5 1-6 2-6 6-7

Women's Singles Competition
 Steffi Graf →  Gold Medal
 First Round – Bye 
 Second Round – Defeated Leila Meskhi (Soviet Union) 7-5 6-1
 Third Round – Defeated Catherine Suire (France) 6-3 6-0 
 Quarterfinals – Defeated Larisa Neiland (Soviet Union) 6-2 4-6 6-3
 Semifinals – Defeated Zina Garrison (USA) 6-2 6-0 
 Final – Defeated Gabriela Sabatini (Argentina) 6-3 6-3
 Sylvia Hanika
 First Round – Bye 
 Second Round – Defeated Julia Muir (Zimbabwe) 6-1 6-1
 Third Round – Lost to Gabriela Sabatini (Argentina) 6-1 4-6 2-6
 Claudia Kohde-Kilsch
 First Round – Bye 
 Second Round – Lost to Raffaella Reggi (Italy) 6-4 6-7 3-6

Water polo

Men's Team Competition
 Preliminary round (group A)
 Defeated Australia (13-11)
 Defeated France (10-9)
 Defeated South Korea (18-2)
 Defeated Italy (10-7)
 Defeated Soviet Union (9-8)
 Semi Finals
 Lost to Yugoslavia (10-14)
 Bronze Medal Match
 Lost to Soviet Union (13-14) → 4th place

 Team roster
 Peter Röhle
 Dirk Jacoby
 Frank Otto
 Uwe Sterzik
 Armando Fernández
 Andreas Ehrl
 Ingo Borgmann
 Rainer Osselmann
 Hagen Stamm
 Thomas Huber
 Dirk Theismann
 René Reimann
 Werner Obschernikat
Head coach: Nicola Firuio

Weightlifting

Wrestling

References

Germany, West
1988
Summer Olympics